Gerhard Reithmeier (born 26 June 1977) from Bergen is a German ski mountaineer.

Selected results
 2001:
 German record time, Trofeo Mezzalama (together with Georg Nickaes and Matthias Robl)
 2004:
 4th, German Championship
 11th, World Championship relay race (together with Stefan Klinger, Tim Stachel and Toni Steurer)
 2006:
 6th, German Championship
 2008:
 2nd ("seniors I" ranking), Patrouille des Glaciers (together with Georg Nickaes and Benedikt Böhm)

External links
 Gerhard Reithmeier at skimountaineering.com

References and notes

1977 births
Living people
German male ski mountaineers